"Metallic skink" may also refer to the garden skink (Lampropholis delicata).

Carinascincus metallicus, the metallic cool-skink or metallic skink is a species of skink in the family Scincidae.  It is endemic to Australia, found in southern Victoria, as well as in Tasmania where it is the most widespread and common lizard, occurring on many offshore islands in Bass Strait as well as the mainland.  It gives birth to live young. It is highly variable in colour and pattern, and may be a complex of closely related species.

References

Carinascincus
Skinks of Australia
Endemic fauna of Australia
Reptiles described in 1874
Taxa named by Arthur William Edgar O'Shaughnessy